William Fryer Harvey AM (14 April 1885 – 4 June 1937), known as  W. F. Harvey, was an English writer of short stories, most notably in the macabre and horror genres. Among his best-known stories are "August Heat" (1910) and "The Beast with Five Fingers", described by horror historian Les Daniels as "minor masterpieces".

Early life

Born into a wealthy Quaker family in Leeds, West Yorkshire, he attended the Quaker Bootham School in Yorkshire and Leighton Park School  in Reading before going on to Balliol College, Oxford.  He took a degree in medicine at Leeds. Ill health dogged him, however, and he devoted himself to personal projects such as his first book of short stories, Midnight House (1910).

Service in World War I
In World War I he initially joined the Friends' Ambulance Unit, but later served as a surgeon-lieutenant in the Royal Navy, and received the Albert Medal for Lifesaving. He received lung damage during his award-winning rescue operation. The damage troubled him for the rest of his life, but he continued to write both short stories and his cheerful and good-natured memoir We Were Seven (1936).

Religious beliefs

Harvey was a practising Quaker.

Post-war career
Before the war he had shown interest in adult education, on the staff of the Working Men's College, Fircroft, Selly Oak, Birmingham.  He returned to Fircroft in 1920, becoming Warden, but by 1925 ill-health forced his retirement.  

In 1928 he published a second collection of short stories, The Beast with Five Fingers, and in 1933 he published a third, Moods and Tenses.  He lived in Switzerland with his wife for much of this time, but nostalgia for his home country caused his return to England.

Death
He moved to Letchworth in 1935 and died there in 1937 at the age of 52. After a funeral service at the local Friends Meeting House Harvey was buried in the churchyard of St Mary the Virgin in Old Letchworth.

Posthumous publications

The release of the film The Beast with Five Fingers (1946), directed by Robert Florey and starring Peter Lorre, inspired by what was perhaps his most famous and praised short story, caused a resurgence of interest in Harvey's work.  In 1951 a posthumous fourth collection of his stories, The Arm of Mrs Egan and Other Stories, appeared, including a set of twelve stories left in manuscript at the time of his death, headed "Twelve Strange Cases".

In 2009 Wordsworth Editions printed an omnibus volume of Harvey's stories, titled The Beast with Five Fingers, in its Tales of Mystery and the Supernatural series. The volume contains 45 stories and an introduction by David Stuart Davies.

Publications
 Midnight House and Other Tales (1910)
 The Misadventures of Athelstan Digby (1920)
 A Conversation About God (1923), with William Fearon Halliday
 The Beast with Five Fingers and Other Tales (1928)
 Quaker Byways and Other Papers (1929)
 Moods and Tenses: Tales (1933)
 The Mysterious Mr. Badman (1934)
 John Rutty of Dublin, Quaker Physician (1934), reprinted from The Friends' Quarterly Examiner  
 We Were Seven (1936)
 Caprimulgus (1936)
 Mr. Murray and the Boococks (1938)
 Midnight Tales (1946) – a selection of twenty macabre tales from earlier collections, published by J. M. Dent
 The Arm of Mrs. Egan and Other Stories (1951) – previously uncollected stories, mainly mysteries,  published by J. M. Dent
 The Double Eye (2009), introduction by Richard Dalby
 The Beast with Five Fingers: Supernatural Stories (2009), selected and introduced by David Stuart Davies, published by Wordsworth Editions

References

Further reading
Ashley, Mike, "Harvey, W(illiam) F(ryer)", in David Pringle, ed., St. James Guide to Horror, Ghost and Gothic Writers (Detroit: St. James Press, 1998) 
Richardson, Maurice, "Introduction" to Midnight Tales by W. F. Harvey (London: J. M. Dent & Sons 1946)
Searles, A. Langley, "A Few More Uncomfortable Moments", Fantasy Commentator 27 (Spring 1953)

External links
 
 
 
 
 

1885 births
1937 deaths
19th-century English people
20th-century British short story writers
20th-century English memoirists
20th-century Quakers
Alumni of Balliol College, Oxford
English short story writers
English horror writers
Ghost story writers
English Quakers
Writers from Leeds
Recipients of the Albert Medal (lifesaving)
People associated with the Friends' Ambulance Unit
Burials in Hertfordshire
People educated at Bootham School
People educated at Leighton Park School
Royal Navy personnel of World War I
English expatriates in Switzerland